Millennium Centre or Millennium Center can refer to:

 Millennium Centar, a sports arena and business centre in Vršac, Serbia
 Millennium Centre (Chicago), a skyscraper in Chicago, Illinois, United States
Millennium Center (Sofia), а building in Sofia, Bulgaria
 The Millennium Centre, a sixth-form college in Derbyshire, England
 Wales Millennium Centre, a performing arts complex located on the Cardiff Bay waterfront, Wales